Carlos Adan Jerez (born 30 March 1979) is an Argentine professional boxer.

Pro career
On September 2, 2008, Jerez lost a 10 round Unanimous Decision to top Welterweight Prospect, Mexican Canelo Álvarez.

On June 30, 2010, Jerez lost a 12 round Unanimous Decision against Anthony Mundine.

Professional record

|- style="margin:0.5em auto; font-size:95%;"
|align="center" colspan=8|44 Wins (18 knockouts), 20 Losses, 3 Draw
|- style="margin:0.5em auto; font-size:95%;"
|align=center style="border-style: none none solid solid; background: #e3e3e3"|Res.
|align=center style="border-style: none none solid solid; background: #e3e3e3"|Record
|align=center style="border-style: none none solid solid; background: #e3e3e3"|Opponent
|align=center style="border-style: none none solid solid; background: #e3e3e3"|Type
|align=center style="border-style: none none solid solid; background: #e3e3e3"|Rd., Time
|align=center style="border-style: none none solid solid; background: #e3e3e3"|Date
|align=center style="border-style: none none solid solid; background: #e3e3e3"|Location
|align=center style="border-style: none none solid solid; background: #e3e3e3"|Notes
|-align=center
|Win || 44-20-3 ||align=left| Fernando Enrique Bataglia
| || 4 (4)
| || align=left|
|align=left|
|-align=center
|Loss || 43-20-3 ||align=left| Zac Dunn
| || 5 (10)
| || align=left|
|align=left|
|-align=center
|Win || 43-19-3 ||align=left| Alberto Gustavo Sanchez
| || 4 (4)
| || align=left|
|align=left|
|-align=center
|Loss || 42-19-3 ||align=left| Marco Antonio Periban
| || 5 (10)
| || align=left|
|align=left|
|-align=center
|Win || 42-18-3 ||align=left| Crispulo Javier Andino
| || 4 (4)
| || align=left|
|align=left|
|-align=center
|Win || 41-18-3 ||align=left| Osvaldo Leonardo Acuna
| || 6 (6)
| || align=left|
|align=left|
|-align=center
|Loss || 40-18-3 ||align=left| John Jackson
| || 10 (10)
| || align=left|
|align=left|
|-align=center
|Win || 40-17-3 ||align=left| Alberto Gustavo Sanchez
| || 6 (6)
| || align=left|
|align=left|
|-align=center
|Win || 39-17-3 ||align=left| Sergio Daniel Cordoba
| || 4 (4) ||  || align=left|
|align=left|
|-align=center
|Loss || 38-17-3 ||align=left| Sherzod Husanov
| || 12 (12) ||  || align=left|
|align=left|
|-align=center
|Win || 38-16-3 ||align=left| Samuel Rogers
| || 10 (10) ||  || align=left|
|align=left|
|-align=center
|Loss || 37-16-3 ||align=left| Vyacheslav Senchenko
| || 4 (10) ||  || align=left|
|align=left|
|-align=center
|Win || 37-15-3 ||align=left| Miguel Dario Lombardo
| || 4 (6) ||  || align=left|
|align=left|
|-align=center
|Win || 36-15-3 ||align=left| Pablo Alberto Cortes
| || 6 (6) ||  || align=left|
|align=left|
|-align=center
|Win || 35-15-3 ||align=left| Francisco Nicolas Benitez
| || 4 (4) ||  || align=left|
|align=left|
|-align=center
|Win || 34-15-3 ||align=left| Gustavo Daniel Boggio
| || 6 (6) ||  || align=left|
|align=left|
|-align=center
|Win || 33-15-3 ||align=left| Bernardino Gonzalez
| || 6 (6) ||  || align=left|
|align=left|
|-align=center
|Loss || 32-15-3 ||align=left| Hector Saldivia
| || 10 (10) ||  || align=left|
|align=left|
|-align=center
|Win || 32-14-3 ||align=left| Adan Martinez
| || 6 (6) ||  || align=left|
|align=left|
|-align=center
|Loss || 31-14-3 ||align=left| Max Bursak
| || 12 (12) ||  || align=left|
|align=left|
|-align=center
|Win || 31-13-3 ||align=left| Oscar Rivas Samudio
| || 3 (6) ||  || align=left|
|align=left|
|-align=center
|Loss || 30-13-3 ||align=left| Anthony Mundine
| || 12 (12) ||  || align=left|
|align=left|
|-align=center
|Loss || 30-12-3 ||align=left| Leonard Bundu
| || 5 (12) ||  || align=left|
|align=left|
|-align=center
|Win || 30-11-3 ||align=left| Javier Alberto Mamani
| || 4 (10) ||  || align=left|
|align=left|
|-align=center
|Win || 29-11-3 ||align=left| Francisco Nicolas Benitez
| || 6 (6) ||  || align=left|
|align=left|
|-align=center
|Win || 28-11-3 ||align=left| Raul Elias Rojas
| || 4 (6) ||  || align=left|
|align=left|
|-align=center
|Loss || 27-11-3 ||align=left| Lucas Matthysse
| || 10 (10) ||  || align=left|
|align=left|
|-align=center
|Loss || 27-10-3 ||align=left| Canelo Álvarez
| || 10 (10) ||  || align=left|
|align=left|
|-align=center
|Win || 27-9-3 ||align=left| Amilcar Funes Melian
| || 6 (6) ||  || align=left|
|align=left|
|-align=center
|Loss || 26-9-3 ||align=left| Javier Alberto Mamani
| || 12 (12) ||  || align=left|
|align=left|
|-align=center
|Win || 26-8-3 ||align=left| Raul Elias Rojas
| || 5 (6) ||  || align=left|
|align=left|
|-align=center
|Win || 25-8-3 ||align=left| Rafael Oscar Ferreyra
| || 4 (6) ||  || align=left|
|align=left|
|-align=center
|Win || 24-8-3 ||align=left| Raul Elias Rojas
| || 6 (6) ||  || align=left|
|align=left|
|-align=center
|Loss || 23-8-3 ||align=left| Cesar Cuenca
| || 10 (10) ||  || align=left|
|align=left|
|-align=center
|Loss || 23-7-3 ||align=left| Diego Martin Alzugaray
| || 6 (6) ||  || align=left|
|align=left|
|-align=center
|Win || 23-6-3 ||align=left| Nestor Fabian Sanchez
| || 2 (6) ||  || align=left|
|align=left|
|-align=center
|NC || 22-6-3 ||align=left| Hugo Alfredo Santillan
| || 2 (6) ||  || align=left|
|align=left|
|-align=center
|Win || 22-6-3 ||align=left| Justo Evangelista Martinez
| || 8 (8) ||  || align=left|
|align=left|
|-align=center
|Draw || 21-6-3 ||align=left| Ruben Dario Oliva
| || 6 (6) ||  || align=left|
|align=left|
|-align=center
|Win || 21-6-2 ||align=left| Walter Damian Diaz
| || 8 (12) ||  || align=left|
|align=left|
|-align=center
|Loss || 20-6-2 ||align=left| Raul Horacio Balbi
| || 10 (10) ||  || align=left|
|align=left|
|-align=center
|Loss || 20-5-2 ||align=left| Ruben Dario Oliva
| || 6 (6) ||  || align=left|
|align=left|
|-align=center
|Win || 20-4-2 ||align=left| Ruben Dario Oliva
| || 8 (8) ||  || align=left|
|align=left|
|-align=center
|Loss || 19-4-2 ||align=left| Walter Matthysse
| || 8 (12) ||  || align=left|
|align=left|
|-align=center
|Win || 19-3-2 ||align=left| Facundo David Tolosa
| || 10 (10) ||  || align=left|
|align=left|
|-align=center
|Win || 18-3-2 ||align=left| Carlos Rene Montiel
| || 5 (6) ||  || align=left|
|align=left|
|-align=center
|Draw || 17-3-2 ||align=left| Javier Alberto Mamani
| || 8 (8) ||  || align=left|
|align=left|
|-align=center
|Loss || 17-3-1 ||align=left| Javier Alejandro Blanco
| || 6 (8) ||  || align=left|
|align=left|
|-align=center
|Win || 17-2-1 ||align=left| Alfredo Ramon Comaschi
| || 4 (4) ||  || align=left|
|align=left|
|-align=center
|Win || 16-2-1 ||align=left| Carlos Wilfredo Vilches
| || 4 (12) ||  || align=left|
|align=left|
|-align=center
|Draw || 15-2-1 ||align=left| Sergio Gaston Finetto
| || 6 (6) ||  || align=left|
|align=left|
|-align=center
|Win || 15-2 ||align=left| Marcelo Leandro Gutierrez
| || 6 (6) ||  || align=left|
|align=left|
|-align=center
|Loss || 14-2 ||align=left| Sebastian Andres Lujan
| || 7 (12) ||  || align=left|
|align=left|
|-align=center

References

External links

Argentine male boxers
Welterweight boxers
1979 births
Living people